Guy Ménard (born 1948 in Granby, Quebec, Canada) is a Canadian sociologist, a professor, a novelist and a poet. He was a professor in the department of religious sciences at the Université du Québec à Montréal and director of the journal Religiologiques.

Publications 
 From Sodomy to Exodus, 1993
 The ruses of the technique, 1988
 A small treaty of the real religion  - For those who wish to understand a little better the 21st century, 1999
 The acute accent, 1983
 Jamädhlavie, 1990
 Fragments, 1978
 Hiéroclips. Haïkus baroques, 1998
 The cloisters, 2000
 Moon of the winds, 2007
 Confections, 2016

References

1948 births
Living people
People from Granby, Quebec
Writers from Quebec
Canadian male poets
Canadian male novelists
Université du Québec à Montréal alumni
20th-century Canadian poets
20th-century Canadian novelists
21st-century Canadian poets
21st-century Canadian novelists
Canadian novelists in French
Canadian poets in French
21st-century Canadian male writers